Kayky Fernandes de Brito (born October 6, 1988) is a Brazilian actor. He is the younger brother of actress Sthefany Brito.

Career 
In 2003, he played himself in "Domingão do Faustão." He has played characters in "Chiquititas Brasil," "O Beijo do Vampiro," Xuxa Abracadabra, "Chocolate com Pimenta," "A Diarista," "Começar de Novo," "Alma Gêmea",Socorro, Virei Uma Garota! ,"Cobras & Lagartos," and most recently, "Sete Pecados." He also acted in a theater production of "A Ordem Natural das Coisas," in 2003, a TV commercial for Carrefour in 2004, and another commercial in 2006 for Havaianas. He's playing a character in "Passione".

Awards 
He was nominated for Contigo's best supporting actor award in 2003, for "Chocolate com Pimenta." 
In 2004, he won for Contigo's most promising actor award, for his part in "O Beijo do Vampiro."

External links 
 
 Kayky Brito Magazine

1988 births
Living people
Male actors from São Paulo
Brazilian male stage actors
Brazilian male telenovela actors